Thomas John William Probert (born 26 September 1986) is an English former first-class cricketer.

Probert was born at Pembury in September 1986. He was educated at The Judd School, before going up to Peterhouse, Cambridge. While studying at Cambridge, he made a single appearance in first-class cricket for Cambridge University against Oxford University at Fenner's in 2009. He played first-class cricket for Cambridge until 2013, making four appearances. A right-arm medium pace bowler, he took 12 wickets at an average of 31.91 in his four appearances, with best figures of 4 for 20. In addition to playing first-class cricket, Probert also played minor counties cricket for Cambridgeshire in 2011, making a single appearance in the MCCA Knockout Trophy.

References

External links

1986 births
Living people
People from Pembury
People educated at The Judd School
Alumni of Peterhouse, Cambridge
English cricketers
Cambridge University cricketers
Cambridgeshire cricketers